Excitable may refer to:
 a song on the 1987 Def Leppard album Hysteria
 a hit song by the British band Amazulu
 a cell that can respond to stimuli

See also
 Excitable medium (mathematics / system analysis)
 Cell excitability (biology)